Jack Vale may refer to:

 Jack Vale (Australian footballer) (1905–1970), Australian footballer
 Jack Vale (comedian) (born 1973), American comedian
 Jack Vale (footballer, born 2001), Welsh footballer